Bhagabanpur is a village, in Bhagabanpur I CD block in Egra subdivision of Purba Medinipur district in the state of West Bengal, India.

Geography

Location

Police station
Bhagabanpur police station has jurisdiction over Bhagabanpur I CD block. Bhagabanpur police station covers an area of 179.95 km2 with a population of 2,288.68. The police station is located at Bhagabanpur.

Urbanisation
96.96% of the population of Egra subdivision live in the rural areas. Only 3.04% of the population live in the urban areas, and that is the lowest proportion of urban population amongst the four subdivisions in Purba Medinipur district.

Note: The map alongside presents some of the notable locations in the subdivision. All places marked in the map are linked in the larger full screen map.

Demographics
As per 2011 Census of India Bhagabanpur had a total population of 2,566 of which 1,294 (50%) were males and 1,272 (50%) were females. Population below 6 years was 348. The total number of literates in Bhagabanpur was 1,968 (88.73% of the population over 6 years).

Transport
The road from Bazkul to Patashpur passes through Bhagabanpur. At Patashpur, one road leads to Egra on SH 5, and another road leads to Debra on NH 16.

Education
Bhagwanpur High School at Bhagabanpur is a boys only Bengali medium higher secondary school established in 1923.

The nearest degree college, Bajkul Milani Mahavidyalaya, was established at Tethi Bari mouza, PO Kismat Bajkul, in 1964.

Culture
David J. McCutchion mentions the Kali temple as a 19th-century at-chala where a tiny but a fully developed upper tower is perched on what is basically a char-chala design.

Dakhsina Kali Temple picture gallery

Healthcare
Bhagabanpur Rural Hospital at Bhagabanpur (with 30 beds) is the main medical facility in Bhagabanpur I CD block. There are primary health centres at Bibhisanpur (with 10 beds), Kajlagarh (with 6 beds) and Seulipur, PO Paschimbarh (with 6 beds).

References

External links

Villages in Purba Medinipur district